Shajapur District is a district of Madhya Pradesh state of central India. The town of Shajapur is the district headquarters.

Shajapur District is part of the Malwa Plateau. The district is situated in the northwestern part of the state and lies between latitudes 32"06' and 24" 19' North and longitudes 75" 41' and 77" 02' East. The district is bounded by Ujjain District to the west, Dewas and Sehore to the south and Rajgarh to the north. Shajapur district is part of Ujjain Division.Shajapur district in Ujjain division was brought during 1981 census. The district is identified from the Headquarters town Shajapur named after honor of Shahjahan the Mughal Emperor who halted here in 1640. It is said that the original name was Shahjahanpur, which subsequently reduces to Shajapur. Since the formation of the Gwalior state, it has remained a district.

History

The district was formerly a district of Gwalior State. When Gwalior acceded to the Government of India after Indian Independence in 1947, Shajapur District, along with the rest of Gwalior State, became part of Madhya Bharat. Madhya Bharat was merged into Madhya Pradesh on November 1, 1956.

Geography

The entire district is a part of the Deccan Traps flood basalts of the Cretaceous-Paleocene. Alluvium of the recent period is, however, found along the river Parbati in a narrow strip. The district has deep black and shallow black brown and alluvial soils of the northern region. Shajapur is a part of central Madhya Pradesh plateau and Ratlam plateau.

Agar-Malwa (Baijnath Dham)
This is the western part of the district covering the major areas of Agar malwa tehsil. There is a hill tract in the west of Badod town showing scattered hillocks in a north-south direction. The presence of hills in the center has affected the drainage pattern. The height of this tract varies between 500 and 545 meters above the mean sea level and it slopes towards the north. Dudhaliy and Kachhol are the main streams in the west, originating from the hill tract and draining towards the west. Chhoti Kali Sindh, which is the main perennial stream of the region, flows northwards on the western border of the region.

Shajapur forested upland

The region stretches from north to south in the middle of the district covering considerable portions of Agar Malwa and Shajapur tehsils and a small part of Susner tehsil. It is a part of the Malwa plateau with typical topography. There is a continuous chain of hills throughout the entire region. The height of the region varies between 450 and 530 meters above the mean sea level. The surface height decreases towards the north. Since it is an upland area, a number of seasonal streams originate from this zone and drain mostly towards the east. Lakundar and Ahu are the main streams flowing from south to north in this region. The streams that join the Lakundar river on its left bank, originate from this hill tract. The Ahu river drains along the western border of the region. The hilly terrain is covered with forest.

Kali Sindh basin

The Kali Sindh basin stretches between the southern and northern limits of the district. It occupies the major parts of Susner and Shajapur tehsils and a very small part of Agar tehsil. The southern part of the region is hilly whereas the northern part is plain. The hills gradually decrease in height from south to north. There are a few scattered hillocks in the central and northern parts also. The altitude of the region varies between 450 and 528 meters above the mean sea level. Numerous streams originate from the hilly area and dissect the surface. Kali Sindh is the main river, which traverses through the hills and further flows on the eastern border of the district. Lakundar is the main rivulets of Kali Sindh that flows northwards. Geologically the entire region is a part of the Deccan Trap of the Cretaceous Eocene period.
Its main helping river is kanthal that is the major source of water in Soyat Kalan.

Shajapur upland

This region extends over the eastern part of the district covering the entire Shujalpur tehsil and a small segment of Shajapur tehsil. Being a part of the Malwa plateau, it presents a dissected topography. A hill range enters this region from the north and extends towards the south. The southern part of the region is an upland area and northern part is relatively low lying. In the south, the hills are scattered and are eroded by various streams. The height at the region varies between 435 and 507 meters above the main sea level. The 450 meters contour encircles the area along the Newaj river where the small hills are spread, and the Newaj dissects these hills. The eastern part of the region is a low and water dividing line of the western part can be decided by the tributaries of Newaj. The river Newaj and Parbati drains the region. The river Parbati flows northwards on the eastern border of the region while river Newaj flows in the middle of the region. Both the rivers are perennial.

Demographics

According to the 2011 census, Shajapur District has a population of 1,512,681, roughly equal to the nation of Gabon or the US state of Hawaii. This gives it a ranking of 330th in India (out of a total of 640). Its population growth rate over the decade 2001-2011 was 17.17%. Shajapur has a sex ratio of 939 females for every 1000 males, and a literacy rate of 70.17%.

After the separation of Agar Malwa district, the residual district had a population of 941,403, of which 176,219 (18.72%) lived in urban areas. Shajapur had a sex ratio of 931 females per 1000 males. Scheduled Castes and Scheduled Tribes make up 218,016 (23.95%) and 23,895 (2.54%) of the population respectively. Hindi is the only language spoken in the district.

References

External links

Shajapur District website

 
Districts of Madhya Pradesh